The Wedding Diary, is a 2012 Malaysian and Singaporean co-produced romantic comedy film directed by Adrian Teh.

Plot
Malaysian engineer Daniel tries to throw a lavish wedding dinner in order to please the wealthy Singaporean family of his new wife, Tina.

Cast
 Ah Niu as Daniel Chua Wei Keat
 Elanne Kong as Tina Chong Sze Xin
 Kara Wai as Allison Chan
 Zhu Houren as Collin Chong
 Shaun Chen as Jeremy
 Tong Bing Yu
 Maggie Teng

Release
The film released in theatres in Singapore and Malaysia on 9 February 2012. The film had a successful theatrical run in both Malaysia and Singapore.

Reception

Box office 
The Wedding Diary earned RM$3.8 million in Malaysia and RM$1.4 million in Singapore.

Critical response 
Chen Yunhong of Lianhe Wanbao rated the film three-and-a-half stars out of five. Boon Chan of The Straits Times rated the film one star out of five, calling the relationship between Daniel and Tina "unconvincing", and criticised the use of cliches and product placement.

Sequel 
Due to the good results of the box office takings, the production companies decide to film a sequel, The Wedding Diary II (结婚那件事之后), focusing on the lives of the couple raising their children. It was released in February 2013.

References

External links
 

2012 films
Malaysian romantic comedy films